Punjab Khal Panchayat Authority was established under the Punjab Khal Panchayat Ordinance 2019 on 22 May 2019 to handle warabandi in the Punjab province of Pakistan. The ordinance was later adopted as Punjab Khal Panchayat Act on 13 December 2019. After the promulgation of Punjab Khal Panchayat Ordinance on 22 May, 2019, the Punjab Irrigation and Drainage Authority Act 1997 was repealed and Punjab Irrigation and Drainage Authority (PIDA) was also abolished along with its Area Water Boards (AWBs) and Farmer Organizations (FOs). 

The authority has been established with a view to ensure implementation of warabandi (rotational program) in letter & spirit resulting minimizing the water disputes and distribution of Irrigation Water Supplies to all the water users. The objective of public participation in decision making process is being achieved through the establishment of Khal Panchayats at outlet level in all over the Punjab which focuses that farmers managed their problems at grass root level in cordial relationship with Technical Experts of Punjab Irrigation Department.

References

Government agencies of Punjab, Pakistan
Departments of Government of Punjab, Pakistan
Agriculture in Punjab, Pakistan